Douglas Herrick (born 2 June 1989) is a Guamanian former international footballer. He played for the Guam national team.

After playing with the Seattle Sounders FC U-23 in the Premier Development League in 2012, he signed with Major League Soccer in 2013 to serve as a league emergency pool goalkeeper. As part of his signing, he would continue to train with Seattle Sounders FC and served as their backup for a match against the San Jose Earthquakes as Marcus Hahnemann was serving a suspension.  He was released at the end of the season.

Today Herrick works in children’s therapy and coaches for OL Reign Academy as their director of goalkeeping  

After retiring, he joined Reign FC as goalkeeper coach in 2017.

References

External links

1989 births
Living people
American soccer players
Guamanian footballers
Guam international footballers
Washington Crossfire players
Seattle Sounders FC U-23 players
Charlotte Eagles players
Association football goalkeepers
Soccer players from Seattle
Portland Timbers draft picks
USL League Two players
USL Championship players
Saint Mary's Gaels men's soccer players
OL Reign non-playing staff